Kavika Dilshan (born 18 February 2000) is a Sri Lankan cricketer. He made his first-class debut for Sri Lanka Navy Sports Club in Tier B of the 2018–19 Premier League Tournament on 31 January 2019. He made his List A debut on 16 December 2019, for Galle Cricket Club in the 2019–20 Invitation Limited Over Tournament.

References

External links
 

2000 births
Living people
Sri Lankan cricketers
Galle Cricket Club cricketers
Sri Lanka Navy Sports Club cricketers
Place of birth missing (living people)